Lepidochrysops anerius is a butterfly in the family Lycaenidae. It is found in the Democratic Republic of the Congo, Tanzania and Zambia. Its habitat consists of woodland.

Both sexes feed from the flowers of herbaceous plants. Adults are on wing from November to December, while adults of subspecies kiellandi have been recorded on wing in November and April.

Subspecies
Lepidochrysops anerius anerius (Democratic Republic of the Congo: Shaba, north-eastern Zambia)
Lepidochrysops anerius kiellandi Stempffer, 1972 (Tanzania: eastern shores of Lake Tanganyika)

References

Butterflies described in 1924
Lepidochrysops